Farah Weheliye Addo, also known as Sindiko (born 1935 or 1940, died November 19, 2008), was a prominent Somali sports administrator.

Biography
Addo hailed from the Harti Abgaal clan. He spent many years in a leadership role in international sports. A former referee, he would later become chairman of the Somali Football Association, the Council for East and Central Africa Football Associations, and of the Somali Olympic Committee. Farah was also a former first vice-president of the African Football Confederation (CAF) and an Honorary Member of the organisation.

Addo died on Wednesday November 19, 2008 in Egypt, at the age of 73.

References

2008 deaths
Year of birth uncertain